Glenridding House is a Regency era building in Glenridding on Ullswater, constructed between 1807 and 1814. It was a private summer villa until about 1860 and then became a guest house. It has recently been fully restored and is now a country house bed and breakfast and wedding venue.  The building is recorded in the National Heritage List for England as a designated Grade II listed building.

Early history

The Reverend Henry Askew (1766-1852) who was the Rector of Greystoke, built the house in about 1810. Records show that he bought the land from John Mounsey who owned the Manor of Glenridding, in 1807. His house was completed by 1814. This is known because in this year William Green, the famous English landscape painter published a series of prints each of which was described. The description for No 53 called “Ullswater Head” (which is shown) states “the house not long ago erected by Rev Henry Askew is on the right.”

Henry was born in 1766 in Lancashire. His father Anthony Askew was a doctor and owned Storrs Hall In Lancashire. In 1799 Henry married Anne Sunderland who was the daughter of the well known artist Thomas Sunderland. In about 1820 Thomas drew a view of Ullswater in which he included Glenridding House. This drawing is shown. He also drew a picture of the house which he called “The Rev Askew’s House at Glenridding”. This artwork is held by the Fitzwilliam Museum.

Henry died in 1852 and his son Henry William Askew sold the property. The advertisement for the sale in 1854 contained the following description.

After the sale of the house in 1854 the property became mostly accommodation for tourists and visitors. One of these was Charles Darwin who holidayed at Glenridding House in 1881.

Charles Darwin at Glenridding House

In June 1881 Charles Darwin stayed at Glenridding House with his family for a five-week holiday. His daughter Hanrietta wrote about their stay. She said:

Darwin himself wrote of the holiday, saying "This place is magnificently beautiful, and I enjoy the scenery".

See also

Listed buildings in Patterdale

References

External links
 Glenridding House website

Grade II listed buildings in Cumbria
Hotels in Cumbria
Patterdale